Katta Maisamma temple is a Hindu temple located at Tank Bund in Hyderabad, Telangana state. Hindus offer prayers to Goddess Katta Maisamma at the temple during the time of the Bonalu festival.
Katta Maisamma popularly known as Amma also located at Turkyamjal. People praise her mainly for the purpose of Happiness, peacefulness and prosperity. Enjoy the Miracles of Turkayamjal Katta Maisamma.

Location
Kanakala Katta Maisamma temple is located on Lower Tank Bund. Katta Maisamma Temple is one of the most significant temples in the city of Hyderabad. This temple is located on lower Tank Bund road, near Indira Park, in between Hyderabad and Secunderabad.

The Katta Maisamma Temple of Hyderabad is principally dedicated to the Mother Goddess Maisamma. The Goddess is a manifestation of Shakti or strength. The faithful believe that worship of the Goddess in the Katta Maisamma Temple imparts power within a person by virtue of which he or she may have the strength and resolve to overcome all adversities in life.

The word Katta denotes a bridge across a river or a lake. The Golconda Patel family built the Katta Maisamma Temple during the construction of the Tankbund to procure the Goddesses' favor and blessing for the well-being of people crossing the bridge.

In the month of Ashad (July), the temple witnesses a large crowd of devotees for the "Bonalu" festival. The month of Karthikamasam is also marked here with grand celebrations. Even the Nizam of Hyderabad would make an offering to the Goddess in the month of ashad to secure the safety of Kingdom of Hyderabad.

During massive floods in Hyderabad in 1908, 6th Nizam of Hyderabad Deccan Mir Mahboob Ali Khan made an offering to the Goddess on the banks of Musi river and immediately floods came under control which saved Hyderabad from devastating damage.

The Hindus of Telangana believe in Goddess 'Katta Maisamma' as supremely powerful and eternal, as well as the giver of health, prosperity and happiness. 'Mother Maisamma' in the Katta Maisamma Temple in Hyderabad is religiously worshiped with great faith and devotion.

References

Hindu temples in Hyderabad, India